Burdinne is a municipality of Wallonia located in the province of liège, Belgium.

On 1 January 2006 Burdinne had a total population of 2,824. The total area is 32.57 km2 which gives a population density of 87 inhabitants per km2.

The municipality consists of the following districts: Burdinne, Hannêche, Lamontzée, Marneffe, Oteppe, and Vissoul.

Notable residents
  (1904–1967), first archbishop of Léopoldville (current-day Kinshasa), born in Burdinne

See also
 List of protected heritage sites in Burdinne

References

External links 
 
 Official Website

Municipalities of Liège Province